Loyada (also spelled Lowada) is a  village in the Debra CD block in the Kharagpur subdivision of the Paschim Medinipur district in the state of West Bengal, India.

Geography

Location

Area overview
Kharagpur subdivision, shown partly in the map alongside, mostly has alluvial soils, except in two CD blocks in the west – Kharagpur I and Keshiary, which mostly have lateritic soils. Around 74% of the total cultivated area is cropped more than once. With a density of population of 787 per km2nearly half of the district's population resides in this subdivision. 14.33% of the population lives in urban areas and 86.67% lives in the rural areas.

Note: The map alongside presents some of the notable locations in the subdivision. All places marked in the map are linked in the larger full screen map.

Demographics
According to the 2011 Census of India, Loyada had a total population of 1,520, of which 780 (51%) were males and 740 (49%) were females. There were 211 persons in the age range of 0–6 years. The total number of literate persons in Loyada was 992 (75.78% of the population over 6 years).

.*For language details see Debra (community development block)#Language and religion

Education
Lowada High School is a Bengali-medium coeducational institution established in 1952. The school has facilities for teaching from class V to class XII. It has a library with 2,000 books, 10 computers and a playground.

Lowada Balika Vidyalaya is a Bengali-medium girls only institution established in 1971. The school has facilities for teaching from class V to class XII. It has a library with 534 books and 4 computers.

Culture
David J. McCutchion mentions:
The Gopinath temple of the Mukherjee family as standard West Bengal type pancha-ratna, brick temple with terracotta, built in 1805
The Sridhara temple of the Mukherjee family as a flat roofed or chandni type, with terracotta and stucco work
The Radha-Govinda temple as a smooth rekha deul with a porch having low-founded pyramidal roof, built in 1860, having rich terracotta.

Laoada picture gallery

References

External links

Villages in Paschim Medinipur district